Kevin Lyttle is the debut studio album by Vincentian singer Kevin Lyttle. The album was released in 2004 and included the hit "Turn Me On", which went to top 5 in many countries worldwide.

Album information
The album was produced by a team of various producers, including Salaam Remi and Troy Taylor. It includes Lyttle's biggest hit "Turn Me On" and the second single "Last Drop", both recorded with contribution from Jamaica dancehall artist Spragga Benz, and the cover version of "Sign Your Name" by Terence Trent D'Arby. On some US releases, the song "So High" is replaced with "Dance with Me", featuring Trey Songz, who also delivers guest vocals in "Call Me".

The album entered the Billboard albums chart at number 8, selling 84,000 copies, and would eventually be certified gold. As of January 2009, it has sold 375,000 copies in the US. The album also charted within top 10 of Swiss albums chart and reached number 12 in Japan, but was met with only modest success elsewhere.

Singles
"Turn Me On" was released as the first single in 2003, meeting with a worldwide success at the turn of 2003 and 2004 and placing within top 10 in no less than fifteen countries, including number 1 in Denmark. "Last Drop" followed as the second single in 2004 and although did not repeat the success of "Turn Me On", it still was a top 40 hit in Australia and a number of European countries. "I Got It" was planned as next single, supported by a big promotion, however, "Drive Me Crazy" was released instead in October 2004, with "I Got It" following in January 2005. None of the two latter singles charted.

Critical reception

Kevin Lyttle received mixed to favorable reviews. Ken Capobianco of The Boston Globe described the album as "a sharply melodic and consistently engaging set of songs...a buoyant mix of soca, dancehall, modern reggae, and American R&B and soul".  Tom Horan of The Daily Telegraph described the album as "beautifully judged," comparing Lyttle's voice to Marvin Gaye. AllMusic writer David Jeffries rated the album three stars out of five, stating "Lyttle's breezy and dreamy voice supplies the flair, lilting lightly over a musical background that is as sparkling as it is limited".

The New York Times music critic Kelefa Sanneh described it as "a lightweight but appealing collection of dance tracks, with precise digital beats that sound oddly similar to some European pop" while conceding: "...the songwriting isn't always very interesting, and Mr. Lyttle's voice sometimes seems less expressive than the computers that filter it." Grading the album with a "C" for Entertainment Weekly, Neil Drumming characterized Lyttle's singing as a "weak, whiny wavelength that, at its very best moment ('So High'), mocks Al Green's vulnerable texture."

Track listing

Charts and certifications

Charts

Certifications

References

External links

2004 debut albums
Albums produced by Troy Taylor (record producer)
Albums produced by Scott Storch
Albums produced by Salaam Remi
Kevin Lyttle albums